Peter Downing is an Albertan separatist and the former leader of Wexit Canada, now known as the Maverick Party. Downing founded Wexit Canada in the aftermath of Justin Trudeau's re-election in the 2019 Canadian federal election. Downing is also a former member of the Canadian Armed Forces and the Royal Canadian Mounted Police, serving from 2006 to 2015. He received a conditional discharge for uttering threats against his ex-wife in 2009. Downing stepped aside as leader of Wexit Canada in June after recruiting interim leader and former Conservative Member of Parliament Jay Hill.

Downing was previously a candidate for the Christian Heritage Party of Canada in the 2015 Canadian federal election. Downing created two organizations, Alberta Fights Back and Saskatchewan Fights Back, both of which served as vehicles for his separatist activism. Through this work he became affiliated with the Prairie Freedom Movement, later becoming their spokesperson.

In August 2020, Downing launched the Alberta USA Foundation, along with high visibility billboards in Edmonton and Ottawa, bearing the image of US President Donald Trump, asking the question, "Should Alberta Join the USA?"

Promotion of conspiracy theories 
Downing is reported to have promoted multiple conspiracy theories including accusations that Justin Trudeau left his teaching position over sexual misconduct and that the Pierre Elliott Trudeau Foundation was secretly normalizing pedophilia.

Electoral record

References

Year of birth missing (living people)
Living people
Maverick Party politicians
Separatists
Leaders of political parties in Canada
Western Canadian separatists